The Best-of-7 2012 Korean Series began on Tuesday, October 24, at the Daegu Baseball Stadium in Daegu, South Korea. It featured the Samsung Lions, who had claimed homefield advantage by finishing in first place at the end of the regular season, and the SK Wyverns, who finished second during the regular season and defeated the Lotte Giants in a best-of-5 playoff series (3 games to 2) to advance to the Finals. The Samsung Lions won the series in six games to collect their fifth Korean Series championship.

Roster
Samsung Lions

SK Wyverns

Summary

Matchups

{| width="220" class="wikitable" style="margin:1em auto 1em auto;"
|-
!2012 Korean Series Champion
|- align="center"
|Samsung Lions(Sixth title)
|}

See also
2012 Korea Professional Baseball season
2012 World Series
2012 Japan Series

References

Korean Series
Korean Series
Korean Series
Samsung Lions
SSG Landers